Aghuyeh (also Romanized as Āghūyeh, Aghooyeh, Aghveyeh, and Āghvīyeh; also known as Agi) is a village in Misheh Pareh Rural District, in the Central District of Kaleybar County, East Azerbaijan Province, Iran. At the 2006 census, its population was 250, in 54 families.

References 

Populated places in Kaleybar County